Mani Gopal (Telugu: మణిగోపాల్ ), popularly known by his pen name, Vanamali (Telugu: వనమాలి) is a Telugu lyricist and poet. He is the recipient of the Filmfare Best Lyricist Award. His works include the musical hit Arerey from Happy Days. He holds a PhD in Telugu literature from Madras University.

Background
Dr. Mani Gopal was born in Railway Kodur in Andhra Pradesh. His mother tongue is Tamil. He is always interested in many arts, particularly singing. He took up writing seriously while he was in his degree final year. He never had any ambitions of taking up any form of art seriously and it was the emphasis of his parents on education right from the childhood that made him a voracious reader and motivated him to go ahead with education. Vanamali has earned his Ph.D. with High Honours in Telugu literature. He wrote his first composition which was sung by Vijayalaksmi Sarma in a program in Doordarshan. After that he joined as a reporter in Sitara, a Telugu film weekly and worked there for almost 10 years. During this time he developed his interest in Telugu movies and is one of the leading lyricists and songwriters in Tollywood. He has worked with musical maestros such as Harris Jayaraj, A. R. Rahman and Ilaiyaraaja.

Awards

Filmography

As lyricist 
{| class="wikitable"
!Year
!Film
!Songs 
!Notes
|-
|1999
|Time
|Naa Siggu Tamboolala, Uyyala Pandagochindi, Premenantara, Kanulake Teliyani, Manchu Mutyame
| 
|-
|2004
|Sivaputrudu
|All songs
|Telugu-dubbed version of Pithamagan
|-
|2007
|Happy Days
|
|
|-
|2008
|Avakai Biryani
|
|
|-
| rowspan="2" |2009
|Oy!
|"Waiting For You", "Anukoledenadu", "Povadhe Prema"
|
|-
|Arya 2
|"Karige Loga", "Karige Loga (D-Plugged)"
|
|-
| rowspan="5" |2010
|Robo
|"Neelo Valapu", "Harima Harima"
|
|-
|Maro Charitra
|"Premaney Peray", "Ninnu Nannu"
|
|-
|Prasthanam
|"Nee Rendallo", "Innalluga", "Naayudochaadoe", "Murali Lola"
|
|-
|Gaayam 2
|"Kalagane Kannullo"
|
|-
|Orange
|"Chilipiga", "Nenu Nuvvantu", "O'Range", "Rooba Rooba"
|
|-
| rowspan="2" |2011
|Ko 
|"Aga Naga" (Tamil version); 
All songs (Telugu version)
|
|-
|180
|All songs
|
|-
| rowspan="4" |2012
|Roudram
|
|
|-
|Life Is Beautiful 
|"Beautiful Girl", "Amma Ani Kothaga"
|
|-
|Ninnu Choosthe Love Vasthundi
|All songs except "Bathing at Cannes"
|Telugu-dub version of Engeyum Kadhal
|-
|O Manasa
|All songs
|
|-
| rowspan="3" |2013
|Kadali
|All songs
|Telugu dubbed version of Kadal
|-
|NH4
|
|Telugu dubbed version of NH4
|-
| Kaalicharan || || 
|-
| rowspan="3" |2014
|DK Bose 
|
|
|-
|Manam
|"Kanulanu Thaake"
|
|-
|Karthikeya 
|"Saripovu"
|
|-
|2015
|Nene 
|
|
|-
|rowspan="2"|2017
|Kaadhali
|All songs
|
|-
|Fidaa
|"Hey Pillagaada", "Hey Mister"
|
|-
|2019
|Majili
|"Ye Manishike Majili o"
|
|-
|2019
|Bandobast
|"Hey Amigo"
|"Telugu Dubbed Version of Kaappaan"
|-
|2019 || Oorantha Anukuntunnaru
| "Kanna", "Kanna (Reprise)" ||
|-
|2021
|Kapatadhaari
|"Kalalo Kanupaape", ''Hayaki Baby''
|
|-
|2021
|Kaadan
|"Thaalaattu Paadum"
| Tamil film
|-
|2021
|Aranya
|"Chitike 'Se' Aa Chirugaali"
|
|-
|2021
|Devarakondalo Vijay Premakatha
|"Idhem Nyayame"
|
|-
|2022
|Etharkkum Thuninthavan
|All songs
|Telugu Dubbed version of Tamil film of the same name
|-
|}

 As dialogue writer 
 Aranya'' (2020)

See also
Filmfare Best Lyricist Award (Telugu)

References

External links
TeluguOne interview with lyricist Vanamali
Vanamali profile 
Vanamali lyrics for Happy Days

1974 births
Telugu-language lyricists
Living people
Filmfare Awards South winners
University of Madras alumni